Talne is a town in Zvenyhorodka Raion, Cherkasy Oblast (province) of Ukraine. It hosts the administration of Talne urban hromada, one of the hromadas of Ukraine. It had a population of 

During the nineteenth century, Talne was a centre of Jewish learning and seat of the Tolner Hasidim, a sect of Hasidic Judaism.

Administrative status
Since 1938 it has been a city. Until 18 July, 2020, Talne served as an administrative center of Talne Raion. The raion was abolished in July 2020 as part of the administrative reform of Ukraine, which reduced the number of raions of Cherkasy Oblast to four. The area of Talne Raion was merged into Zvenyhorodka Raion.

Demographics 
In 1989, the population of the city was 17, 169 people.

Notable people 
Anatoly Kasheida, writer
Denis Shevchuk, football player
Mischa Elman, violinist

See also 

 List of cities in Ukraine

Gallery

References

External links
 History of Jewish Community in Talne

Cities in Cherkasy Oblast
Cities of district significance in Ukraine
Umansky Uyezd